Borger is the largest city in Hutchinson County, Texas, United States. The population was 12,551 at the 2020 census. Borger is named for businessman Asa Philip "Ace" Borger, who also established the Hutchinson County seat of Stinnett and several other small towns in Texas and Oklahoma.

History 

Ace Borger and his business partner John R. Miller purchased a  townsite near the Canadian River in March 1926 after the discovery of oil in the vicinity. Within a few months, the boomtown had swollen to a population of 45,000, most lured by sensational advertising and "black gold". In October 1926, the city charter was adopted, and Miller was elected mayor. By this time, the Panhandle & Santa Fe Railway had completed the spur line to Borger, a post office had opened, and a school district was established. The boomtown of Borger soon had steam-generated electricity, telephone service, a hotel, and a jail. Regionalist artist Thomas Hart Benton depicted this period of Borger in his large painting Boomtown.

In the months that followed, oilmen, roughnecks, prospectors, panhandlers, and fortune seekers were joined by cardsharks, prostitutes, bootleggers, and drug dealers. The city became known as "Booger Town", as it attracted criminals and fugitives from the law. The town government soon fell under control of an organized crime syndicate led by Mayor Miller's shady associate, "Two-Gun Dick" Herwig. Dixon Street (now Tenth Street) was the "red-light" district, housing brothels, dance halls, speakeasies, and gambling dens. Murder and robbery became an everyday occurrence, and illegal moonshining and home brewing flourished under the fatherly watch of Herwig and his henchmen, including W. J. (Shine) Popejoy, the king of the Texas bootleggers. Borger became so notorious that in the spring of 1927, Texas Governor Dan Moody sent a force of Texas Rangers to rein in the town. The Texas Rangers were led by Captains Frank Hamer and Thomas R. Hickman. (Hamer would go on to later fame and even infamy as the man who killed Bonnie and Clyde.)

The Rangers did have a stabilizing effect, but Borger still struggled with lawlessness and violence into the 1930s, climaxing with the murder of District Attorney John A. Holmes by an assassin on September 18, 1929. This event caused Governor Moody to impose martial law for a month and send in state troops to help rid the town of its criminal element. Eventually, Borger settled down, but not before town founder Ace Borger was shot and killed at the post office by Arthur Huey on August 31, 1934. Huey was county treasurer and was irked at Ace Borger for not bailing him out of jail on an embezzlement charge. Huey shot Borger five times with a Colt .45 pistol, even pulling Borger's own pistol out of his clothing and shooting him again, along with others there in the post office.

By the late 1930s, Borger was pushed from one era to another by the Great Depression. Phillips Petroleum and others profited from the oil fields in the area, but during this time, the price of oil and gas dropped, ending the "boom" and the rapid growth of Borger. Carbon black plants added black soot to the Dust Bowl storms, covering the town in layers of dark grime. "Okie" migrants forced off their foreclosed farms back in Oklahoma found work in Borger plants and refineries. The Works Project Administration provided the town with new red-brick streets as the ramshackle shacks throughout town were replaced by more permanent buildings. During World War II, synthetic rubber and other petroleum products became important in the Borger area. By the 1960s, the Borger area was one of the largest producers of oil, carbon black, and petrochemicals and supplies in the state. The creation of nearby Lake Meredith also added to the town's economy as an important recreational area.

Today, Borger remains an important shipping point for agricultural produce, as well as for the petroleum products produced there. It is the home of the world's largest inland petrochemical complexes. Chevron-Phillips Chemical Company produces specialty chemicals. Solvay produces RYTON PPS plastics. Phillips 66 Petroleum Company processes crude oil and natural gas liquids. Agrium manufactures nitrogen fertilizer in its Borger plant. Borger also has Sid Richardson Carbon Company, which produces rubber-grade carbon black used to strengthen rubber tires, and Orion Engineered Carbons, Inc., which produces a variety of carbon blacks at its Borger facility. The original townsite is said to have been founded around 1898 by John F. Weatherly, a rancher who built a dugout and gave the future town the grandiose name of Granada. Weatherly's wife wanted it named after her former home—a town in West Virginia called Isom.

In 1900, Weatherly opened a store in his ranchhouse, which also became the first post office. Mrs. Weatherly opened a café and the community had a school opened by 1907. In October 1919, the mail was diverted through Plemons and the Isom post office closed.

The Weatherlys lost interest in the town they founded and moved to the nearby town of Panhandle in 1922, but they wisely retained ownership of all that was Isom. When oil was discovered in early 1926, Weatherly returned and moved the town to the oilfield spur of the railroad near Borger.

Isom was platted with all lots south of First Street being Isom, Texas, and all streets north in Borger. From June to December 1926, the towns were rivals.

Although the town had a railroad depot, several oil-well supply warehouses, and no shortage of would-be citizens, a petition signed by 1,200 residents in early December declared Borger the winner. Isom's school merged with Borger's schools, driving the last stake into Isom.

The town has the dubious distinction of being the oldest of the townsites annexed by Borger.

During the winter of 1982–1983, Borger received a total of 58.7 inches of snow.  This is the most snow that any Texas town has ever received during a winter season.

Politics

Borger and Hutchinson County are among the strongest Republican voting districts in Texas and the nation, having cast GOP ballots at the presidential level in all elections for more than a half century. Even Barry M. Goldwater of Arizona, who received fewer votes nationally and in Texas versus native Texan Lyndon B. Johnson, won Hutchinson County, 5,358 to 4,625. In 1984, Ronald W. Reagan carried 9,078 votes in Hutchinson County to only 2,052 for the Democrat Walter F. Mondale of Minnesota. In 1996, Robert J. Dole of Kansas polled 6,350 votes in Hutchinson County to 2,553 for incumbent President Bill Clinton. H. Ross Perot, the Dallas industrialist, received 864 votes. The only Democrat since Lyndon Johnson to exceed 3,600 votes in Hutchinson County was Jimmy Carter in 1976, but Gerald R. Ford handily defeated him in the county.

In the 2008 presidential primaries, Hutchinson County cast 3,170 votes in the Republican race and 1,538 in the Democratic contest. In the United States Senate primary, 2,875 votes were cast in the Republican primary, largely for incumbent Senator John Cornyn, and 1,211 votes were cast in the Democratic portion of the ballot.

In the 2008 presidential election, Hutchinson County cast 7,361 votes for John McCain and 1,322 for Barack Obama.

Geography and climate

Notes

Demographics

2020 census

As of the 2020 United States census, there were 12,551 people, 4,223 households, and 2,746 families residing in the city.

2010 census
As of the census of 2010, 13,251 people, 5,591 households, and 3,997 families resided in the city. The population density was 1,637.9 people per square mile (632.5/km2). The 6,462 housing units averaged 740.1 per square mile (285.8/km2). The racial makeup of the city was 80.6% White, 3.6% African American, 1.7% Native American, 0.43% Asian, 0.03% Pacific Islander, 9.36% from other races, and 2.44% from two or more races. Hispanics or Latinos of any race were 19.70% of the population.

Of the 5,591 households, 34.9% had children under the age of 18 living with them, 57.9% were married couples living together, 10.0% had a female householder with no husband present, and 28.5% were not families. About 26.5% of all households were made up of individuals, and 13.2% had someone living alone who was 65 years of age or older. The average household size was 2.52 and the average family size was 3.204.

In the city, the population was distributed as 27.8% under the age of 18, 9.8% from 18 to 24, 25.4% from 25 to 44, 20.9% from 45 to 64, and 16.1% who were 65 years of age or older. The median age was 36 years. For every 100 females, there were 95.3 males. For every 100 females age 18 and over, there were 91.2 males.

The median income for a household in the city was $34,653, and for a family was $40,417. Males had a median income of $39,207 versus $19,654 for females. The per capita income for the city was $16,869. About 9.7% of families and 12.0% of the population were below the poverty line, including 15.4% of those under age 18 and 6.3% of those age 65 or over.

Entertainment

The Dome Civic and Convention Center

Movie theaters
 The Morley

Sports
Baseball
 Borger Gassers 1939–1942, 1946–1954 – West Texas–New Mexico League

Education
Primary and secondary education in Borger is almost entirely conducted by the Borger Independent School District, with 2,800 students on six campuses (Paul Belton Early Childhood Center, Crockett and Gateway Elementary, Borger Intermediate School, Borger Middle School, and Borger High School). A private school, Cornerstone Christian Academy, is also in Borger, with over 40 students on campus – an all-time high since it opened in 1990. St. John the Evangelist Catholic Church operated a Catholic school for many years, but it has been closed since the early 1990s.

About 3,000 students in Borger attend the community college, Frank Phillips College.

Notable people
 Donny Anderson, Texas Tech (All-American), NFL football player, halfback for the Green Bay Packers (born in Borger)
 Arian Archer, Miss Texas 1994, top 10 semi-finalist at Miss America 1995
 Tim Baker, Borger High School, Texas Tech, Pittsburgh Steelers, Carolina Panthers, San Diego Chargers
 Darlene Cates, actress
 Emy Coligado, actress
 Mike Conaway, member of the U.S. House of Representatives from Texas's 11th District (which does not include Borger)
 Bill Dees, musician and songwriter
 Stan Hansen, retired professional wrestler and WWE Hall of Fame inductee
 Tony Hillerman, author of the Navajo Mysteries, Borger News-Herald Reporter (1948)
 Danielle Jones, obstetrician-gynecologist, online personality, and medical science communicator focusing on reproductive and sexual health and science education
 Stormie Jones, world's first recipient of a successful simultaneous heart and liver organ transplant
 Joseph C. Krejci, scientist known for developing carbon black production processes
 John LaGrone, football player, Borger High School, SMU (All-American), Dave Campbell's Texas Football and DT, Edmonton Eskimos 
 Gene Mayfield, coach of the Borger Bulldogs, West Texas State University
 Bill McKinney, football player, Borger High School, Chicago Bears
 G. William Miller, former chairman of the Federal Reserve Board and United States Secretary of the Treasury
 Gerald Myers, Texas Tech University basketball coach (1970–1991), athletic director
 Shanna Peeples, U.S. National Teacher of the Year, 2015
 Mike Rawlings, 61st mayor of Dallas
 Don Sahli, artist and painter
 Kel Seliger, member of the Texas State Senate from the 31st District
 Charlotte Mailliard Shultz, Chief of Protocol of State of California and City and County of San Francisco, Trustee San Francisco War Memorial and Performing Arts Center, widow of former Secretary of State George P. Shultz
 Matt Simon, Borger High School assistant coach, 1978
 Billy Sprague, Christian pop singer, songwriter, and producer
David Wright, novelist

References

External links

 Official city website
 Borger News Herald
 Borger Independent School District
 "Isom, Texas, A Panhandle Ghost Town" – from Texasescapes.com
 Phillips 66 Refinery in Borger

 
Cities in Texas
Cities in Hutchinson County, Texas
Micropolitan areas of Texas